Martinius Kristoffersen (18 November 1896 – 9 November 1949) was a Norwegian footballer. He played in two matches for the Norway national football team in 1921 to 1923.

References

External links
 

1896 births
1949 deaths
Norwegian footballers
Norway international footballers
Place of birth missing
Association footballers not categorized by position